Saeed Al Hajri is a Qatari ten-pin bowler. He finished in 16th position of the combined rankings at the 2006 AMF World Cup and won the 2008 Kingdom of Bahrain and Batelco International Bowling Championship.

References

Qatari ten-pin bowling players
Year of birth missing (living people)
Living people
Place of birth missing (living people)
Asian Games medalists in bowling
Bowlers at the 1994 Asian Games
Bowlers at the 2002 Asian Games
Bowlers at the 2006 Asian Games
Asian Games silver medalists for Qatar
Asian Games bronze medalists for Qatar
Medalists at the 1994 Asian Games
Medalists at the 2006 Asian Games